Hugo Mario Montenegro (September 2, 1925 – February 6, 1981) was an American orchestra leader and composer of film soundtracks. His best-known work is interpretations of the music from Spaghetti Westerns, especially his cover version of Ennio Morricone's main theme from the 1966 film The Good, the Bad and the Ugly. He composed the score for the 1969 Western Charro!, which starred Elvis Presley.

Biography
Montenegro was born in New York City in 1925. He served in the U.S. Navy for two years, mostly as an arranger for the Newport Naval Base band in Newport, Rhode Island. After the war he attended Manhattan College while studying composition and leading his own band for school dances.

In the middle 1950s, he was directing, conducting, and arranging the orchestra for Eliot Glen and Irving Spice on their Dragon and Caprice labels. It was he who was directing the Glen-Spice Orchestra on Dion DiMucci's first release when Dion was backed by Dragon recording artists, the Timberlanes. Released on Mohawk #105 in 1957, the songs were "Out In Colorado" and "The Chosen Few", which were soon issued on the Jubilee label for better distribution.

He was later hired by Time Records as a musical director producing a series of albums for the label, and moved to Los Angeles in the early 1960s where he began working for RCA Victor, producing a series of albums and soundtracks for motion pictures and television themes, such as two volumes of Music From The Man From U.N.C.L.E., an album of cover versions of spy music themes Come Spy With Me and an album of cover versions of Ennio Morricone's music for Sergio Leone's Dollars Trilogy that led to major chart hits.

Montenegro began scoring motion pictures with the instrumental music from Advance to the Rear in 1964. Following the success of his albums, he was contracted by Columbia Pictures where he scored such films as Hurry Sundown (1967), Lady in Cement (1968), The Undefeated (1969), Viva Max! (1969) and the Matt Helm films The Ambushers (1967) and The Wrecking Crew (1968). He composed the musical score and conducted the recording sessions for the 1969 Elvis Presley Western film Charro! (1969), and he provided some incidental music for the cult 1970 British film Toomorrow. His last film scores were for the exploitation film Too Hot to Handle and the cult action thriller The Farmer, in 1977.

The Farmer (1977) with Montenegro's chilling electronic music score earned an X rating until producer/director David Berlatsky had the review board review the film again without the music score and the rating was changed from X to R, which allowed Columbia Pictures to distribute the film for 17 years. The music rights in order to release a DVD sale could not be obtained as the estate could not be found, the score is considered "lost".

Montenegro was also contracted to Columbia's television production company Screen Gems where he is most famous for his theme from the second season of the television series I Dream of Jeannie, his theme song "Seattle" and music from Here Come the Brides and The Outcasts. He also composed the music for the long-running  The Partridge Family, (1970).  During the mid‑1960s he started producing some of the most renowned works from the space age pop era, featuring electronics and rock in albums such as Moog Power and Mammy Blue.

Montenegro's electronic works were decisive and influential for the future generations of electronic musicians, giving a retro/futuristic edge by the use of the Moog synthesizer, and helped to push its popularity. He will be also remembered by his versions of classics such as the main theme to Sergio Leone's film The Good, the Bad, and the Ugly, originally composed by Ennio Morricone. This was Montenegro's biggest pop hit, reaching #2 on the Billboard Hot 100 chart, #3 in the Canadian RPM Magazine charts, and spending four weeks atop the UK Singles Chart in 1968. It sold over one and a quarter million copies and was awarded a gold disc.

His version of the main theme from Hang 'em High reached #59 in Canada. In 1968, his hit "Aces High" placed at #11 on the Billboard Year-End Chart of the Top Hits of 1968.

In the late 1970s severe emphysema forced an end to his musical career, and he died of the disease in 1981. He is buried at Welwood Murray Cemetery in Palm Springs, California.

Discography
 Loves Of My Life – Vik Records (RCA Victor) – 1957
 The 20th Century Strings Arranged And Conducted By Hugo Montenegro - Relax With Strings Again – 20th Century Fox Records – 1960
 The 20th Century Strings Volume 1 – 20th Fox – 1960
 Cha Chas For Dancing – Time Records – Series 2000 – 1960
 Bongos and Brass – Time Records – 1960
 Montenegro Plays Dixie – 20th Fox – 1961
 Boogie Woogie + Bongos – Time Records – Series 2000 – 1961
 Great Songs From Motion Pictures Vol. 2 (1938–1944) – Time Records (3) – S/2045 – 1961
 Great Songs From Motion Pictures Vol. 3 (1945–1960) – Time Records (3) – S/2046 – 1961
 Hugo Montenegro In Italy – Oriole – OTS 2040 – 1962
 Spain! – Time Records – 1963
 Overture–American Musical Theatre Vol. 2 – Time-52036/S-2036 – 196?
 Overture–American Musical Theatre Vol. 4 – Time-S/2038 – 1953-1960
 Russian Grandeur LP - RCA Victor - 1964
 Lush and Lovely Movietone - 1965
 Original Music From The Man From U.N.C.L.E. – RCA Victor LSP-3475 – 1965
 Come Spy with Me - RCA Victor LSP-3540 - 1966
 More Music From The Man From U.N.C.L.E. – RCA Victor LSP-3574 – 1966
 Music From Camelot – Mainstream Records	S/6101 – 1967
 Hurry Sundown (Original Soundtrack) – RCA Victor – LSO 1133 – 1967
 Montenegro Brand - 20th Century Fox Records 1967
   Music From A Fistful Of Dollars, For A Few Dollars More & The Good, The Bad And The Ugly – RCA Victor LSP-3927 – 1968
 Lady In Cement (Original Motion Picture Soundtrack Album) – 20th Century Fox Records S4204 – 1968
 Magnificent Hugo Montenegro – Pickwick – SPC-3190 – 1968
 Music From The Good, The Bad and The Ugly – RCA Victor-LPM/LSP-3927 – 1968
 Hang 'Em High – RCA Victor-LPM/LSP-4022 – 1968
 Moog Power – RCA LSP-4170 – 1969
 Good Vibrations – RCA Victor-LSP-4104 – 1969
 Colours of Love – RCA Victor–LSP-4273 – 1970
 Hugo Montenegro's Dawn of Dylan – GWP Records–ST-2003–1970 Stereo
 This Is Hugo Montenegro – RCA Victor-VPS-6036 – 1971
 People... One To One – RCA Victor – LSP-4537 – 1971
 Mammy Blue – RCA – LSP-4631 – 1971
 Love Theme From The Godfather – RCA APD1-0001 – 1972
 Neil's Diamonds – RCA	APS1-0132 – 1973
 Scenes & Themes – RCA – APD1-0025 – 1973
 Hugo Montenegro Plays A Neil Diamond Songbook – RCA Victor – APD!-0132 – 1973
 Hugo In Wonder-Land – RCA APD1-0413 – 1974
 Others By Brothers – APL1-0784	US – 1975
   Movie scored, The Farmer, starring Gary Conway and Angel Tompkins, 1975
 Rocket Man (A Tribute To Elton John) – RCA Victor APL1-1024 – 1975
 Big Band Boogie – Bainbridge Records – BT 1009 – 1980

Digital releases
 Moog Power – BMG Music (Spain) – 1998
 Mammy Blue – BMG Music (Spain) – 1999
 Love Theme From The Godfather – BMG Music (Spain)  – 1999
 Hugo In Wonder-Land – BMG Music (Spain) – 2000
 Neil's Diamonds Fashioned By Hugo Montenegro  – BMG Music (Spain)  – 2002
 Colours Of Love – Sony BMG Music Entertainment (Philippines) – 2008
 Boogie Woogie Bongos – Smith & Co  – 2012
 Cha Chas For Dancing – Time Records – Series 2000 – 2014

References

External links
 
 Montenegro at Space Age Pop

1925 births
1981 deaths
20th-century American composers
20th-century American conductors (music)
20th-century American male musicians
American film score composers
American male conductors (music)
American male film score composers
American music arrangers
American people of Italian descent
American television composers
Burials at Welwood Murray Cemetery
Male television composers
Manhattan College alumni
RCA Victor artists
United States Navy personnel of World War II